L.O.R.D.: Legend of Ravaging Dynasties 2 is a  2020 Chinese computer animated motion capture action fantasy adventure film written and directed by Guo Jingming, the sequel to the first L.O.R.D: Legend of Ravaging Dynasties film. Originally slated to be released in China on 6 July 2018, it was later announced on 27 June that the release would be postponed to a later date due to political reasons. Eventually Fan Bingbing's character was replaced in the movie, and movie was released via online streaming on Tencent on 4 December 2020.

Plot

In order to complete the lash wish of Duke VI, Yin Chen (Kris Wu), Qi Ling (Cheney Chen), Tianshu You Hua (Lin Yun) and the others decide to embark on a journey together to save Gilgamesh, the former Duke I who has been sealed by the Silver Priest. Upon their arrival, they encounter the strongest set of Corroders in You Ming (William Chan), Thalia (Amber Kuo) and Qi La (Wang Duo). A confrontation is inevitable as the darkest secret of the Aslan Empire gradually rises to the surface.

Cast

The Righteous 
 Kris Wu as Yin Chen, Lord to the 7th degree and former disciple to the 1st degree, Gilgamesh
 Cheney Chen as Qi Ling, Disciple to the 7th degree  Yin Chen.
 Lin Yun as Tianshu You Hua, Disciple to the 6th degree and daughter of the 6th lord; likes Qi Ling
 Wang Duo as Qi La, Lord to the 3rd degree
 Roy Wang as one of the Silver Priests
 Karry Wang as Frost (Han Shuang Si), the new Duke VI

The Corroders 
 William Chan as You Ming, Lord to the 2nd degree; Thalia's lover
 Amber Kuo as Thalia, Lord to the 4th degree; You Ming's lover
 Jackson Yi as Prince Yuan Yi, friend to Qi Ling and son of Zujin, former King of Quancang

Original soundtrack

Notes

References

2020 films
Chinese action adventure films
Animated action films
Animated adventure films
Chinese 3D films
Chinese fantasy adventure films
Chinese-language films
Adaptations of works by Guo Jingming
Films shot in China
Films using motion capture
Le Vision Pictures films
IMAX films
Films based on Chinese novels
Films scored by Taku Iwasaki